The 1992 Peach Bowl was an American college football bowl game that was played on January 1, 1992, at Atlanta–Fulton County Stadium in Atlanta, Georgia. The game matched the North Carolina State Wolfpack against the East Carolina Pirates. It was the final contest of the 1991 NCAA Division I-A football season for both teams, and ended in a 37–34 victory for the Pirates. This was the last edition of the Peach Bowl, as well as the last overall football game, played at Atlanta–Fulton County Stadium, as the game moved to the Georgia Dome in the following year.

Teams
The game matched the North Carolina State Wolfpack of the Atlantic Coast Conference against the then-independent East Carolina Pirates in the first bowl game featuring those two teams. NC State was the runner-up of the ACC. The game represented the nineteenth matchup between the two teams; NC State led the series 12–6 heading into the game.

NC State

East Carolina

Game summary

Scoring summary

Source:

Statistics

See also
 East Carolina–NC State rivalry

References

Peach Bowl
Peach Bowl
NC State Wolfpack football bowl games
East Carolina Pirates football bowl games
Peach Bowl
January 1992 sports events in the United States
1992 in Atlanta